Saint-Michel d'Aiguilhe (St. Michael of the Needle) is a chapel in Aiguilhe, near Le Puy-en-Velay, France. The chapel is reached by 268 steps carved into the rock. The surface on top of the plug is 57 metres (187 ft) in diameter.

Bishop Godescalc of Le Puy-en-Velay had the chapel built to celebrate his return from the pilgrimage of Saint James in 951. The chapel is dedicated to the Archangel Michael, the patron of mountaintops and other high places.

A prehistoric dolmen dedicated to Mercury by the Romans was built on the volcanic plug before the construction of the chapel. Three stones from this dolmen are said to be incorporated into the chapel.

In the 12th century, the chapel was enlarged, and a nave, ambulatory, two side chapels, a narthex, a carved portal, more frescoes, and a bell tower were added. The bell tower was built in the style of the nearby Cathedral Notre-Dame-du-Puy.

In 1429, the mother of Joan of Arc, Isabelle Romée, was thought to have come to the site to pray.{
  "type": "FeatureCollection",
  "features": [
    {
      "type": "Feature",
      "properties": {},
      "geometry": {
        "type": "Point",
        "coordinates": [
          3.8825420569628,
          45.049962837419
        ]
      }
    }
  ]
}

References 

Roman Catholic chapels in France
Churches in Haute-Loire
Romanesque architecture in France
Volcanic plugs of Europe